The BRVM Composite is a stock index calculated from the value of each stock on the Bourse Régionale des Valeurs Mobilières, or BRVM.  The BRVM is organized into 7 sectors.  

The Bourse Régionale des Valeurs Mobilières is a regional stock exchange that serves 8 West Africa countries:

  Benin 
  Burkina Faso 
  Guinea Bissau 
  Ivory Coast 
  Mali 
  Niger 
  Senegal 
  Togo. 
The exchange itself is located in Abidjan.

BRVM stock listings
as of March 2009

See also
List of African stock exchanges

External links
 BRVM - Listings
BRVM Company listings and notes at MBendi

African stock market indices